"Kool Thing" is a song by American rock band Sonic Youth, released in June 1990 in the United States (as a promotional single) and September 1990 in Europe, as the first single from their  sixth studio album Goo. The song was inspired by an interview bassist/singer Kim Gordon conducted with LL Cool J for Spin. Although he is never mentioned by name, the song's lyrics contain several references to LL Cool J. Gordon's lyrics that make reference to several of the rapper's works, including the single "I Can't Live Without My Radio" and the album Walking with a Panther. She also repeats the line "I don't think so", which appears in LL Cool J's "Going Back to Cali". Chuck D also contributed spoken vocals to the song.

Critical reception
David Fricke of Rolling Stone referred to the song as "sexually charged," praising Thurston Moore and Steve Shelley's guitar and drum work, respectively. Also from Rolling Stone, Matthew Perpetua designated the song as a "feminist anthem." Jason Ankeny of AllMusic believed the song "teeters on the brink of a cultural breakthrough but falls just shy of the mark." Robert Christgau praised Kim Gordon's performance on the song, citing "Kool Thing" as a standout track from Goo.

Music video
The music video for "Kool Thing", released on June 4, 1990, was the band's first for a major label. The video was directed by Tamra Davis. The video focused on Gordon's fascination with 1960s radicalism (particularly Patty Hearst and the Black Panthers), and featured the band wearing glam style clothing. The video was stylized after LL Cool J's "Going Back to Cali" video, down to the black-and-white camera and go-go dancers. Gordon initially wanted to wear a beret and carry an Uzi, as a self-described "poseur-leftist girl lusting after Black Panthers concept". However, Geffen vetoed the plan. Chuck D appeared in the video.

Spin designated the video as one of the greatest music videos of 1990.

Live performances
On July 29, 1992, Sonic Youth performed "Kool Thing" on Hangin' with MTV in New York City.

Legacy
Brian Molko of Placebo said that "Kool Thing" was the first song he ever heard by Sonic Youth, adding that if it were not for them, his own band would never have existed.

"Kool Thing" has also been frequently featured in TV shows, films and video games, including Guitar Hero III: Legends of Rock, Simple Men, Gilmore Girls, True Crime: New York City, Once Upon a Time and Mr. Robot in addition to appearing as downloadable content for Rock Band.

Track listings and formats
7" vinyl and cassette single
"Kool Thing" (LP version) – 4:04
"That's All I Know (Right Now)"  – 2:30

12" vinyl
"Kool Thing" (LP version) – 4:04
"That's All I Know (Right Now)"  – 2:30
"Kool Thing" (8 track demo version) – 4:13

CD single
"Kool Thing" (LP version) – 4:07
"That's All I Know (Right Now)"  – 2:18
"Dirty Boots" (Rock & Roll Heaven version) – 5:26
"Kool Thing" (8 track demo version) – 4:13

Credits and personnel
Credits and personnel are adapted from the Goo album liner notes.

Sonic Youth
 Thurston Moore – guitar, production
 Lee Ranaldo – guitar, vocals, production
 Kim Gordon – vocals, bass guitar, production
 Steve Shelley – drums, percussion, production

Guest musicians
 Chuck D – additional vocals

Technical
 Nick Sansano – production, recording, additional percussion
 Ron Saint Germain – production, engineering, mixing
 Nick Sansano – additional engineering
 Dan Wood – assistant engineering
 John Herman – assistant engineering
 Judy Kirschner – assistant engineering
 Howie Weinberg – mastering

Charts

References

External links
 

Sonic Youth songs
1990 singles
Grunge songs
Music videos directed by Tamra Davis
1990 songs
Geffen Records singles